Michael Delavan Ward (born January 7, 1951) is an American former politician and radio talk show host who served as a United States Representative from Kentucky. He is a member of the Democratic Party.

Early life and career

Ward was born in White Plains, New York on January 7, 1951. Ward's mother, Lukey Ward, was a political and civil rights activist, and Ward has often said publicly that he was born into politics.  Lukey Ward was, along with her friend Georgia Davis, the day-to-day manager of the Kentucky chapter of Martin Luther King Jr.'s Southern Christian Leadership Conference.  In fact, she was at the Lorraine Motel, waiting to go to dinner with Dr. King, when he was assassinated as he exited his room. Ward's father, Jasper Ward III, was a well-known award-winning architect in Louisville.  His buildings include the Student Center at the University of Louisville and the Jewish Doctors Office Building at Interstate 65 and Liberty Street.  Mike Ward is also the great-great-grandson of Jasper D. Ward, a former 1800s Chicago Congressman and great-grandson of businessman William Delavan Baldwin.

Ward attended the University of Louisville, from which he earned a marketing degree. Before entering politics, he served as a sales executive.

Political and radio career

From 1989 to 1993, Ward served as a member of the Kentucky House of Representatives representing the Highlands area of Louisville. In 1994, he was elected to the United States House of Representatives, winning Kentucky's Third Congressional District seat that was being vacated by Romano L. Mazzoli. Ward was one of few Democrats to win an open seat in the Republican congressional landslide that year. Ward narrowly defeated a field of candidates including Charlie Owen in the primary, and defeated Republican nominee Susan Bush Stokes, a fellow member of the Kentucky House of Representatives, in the general election.  His Campaign TV advertising was directed by Kevin Geddings of Geddings Communications LLC of Washington, DC.

In 1996 Ward lost his seat in the general election to Republican Anne Northup. Ward did not run again for the seat. Ward was appointed by President Bill Clinton as the Associate Director of the Peace Corps and served through Clinton's second presidential term.

From 2001 to 2005, Ward hosted a talk radio show in Louisville that was a liberal counterweight to conservative talk radio programming.

Ward is President of WardCampaigns, Inc.

References

External links

 

1951 births
American talk radio hosts
Democratic Party members of the United States House of Representatives from Kentucky
Living people
Democratic Party members of the Kentucky House of Representatives
Peace Corps volunteers
People from White Plains, New York
Politicians from Louisville, Kentucky
Radio personalities from Louisville, Kentucky
University of Louisville alumni